Brumadinho is a Brazilian municipality in the state of Minas Gerais. The city belongs to the Belo Horizonte metropolitan mesoregion and to the microregion of Belo Horizonte. Brumadinho is at an altitude of 880 m. In 2020 the population was 40,666. The municipality is on the Paraopeba River.

The Inhotim Museum of Contemporary Art, one of the most important art venues of Brazil, is in the city.

The municipality contains part of the   Serra do Rola-Moça State Park, created in 1994.

History
Brumadinho was settled in 1689. The Banda São Sebastião Musical Corporation, a symphonic band, was founded on May 13, 1929, by Tarcilio Gomes da Costa in Brumadinho.  The municipality of Brumadinho itself was officially established on December 17, 1938.

On January 25, 2019, the city was the victim of a tailings dam collapse that killed 270 people. The disaster released a mudflow that advanced over houses in a rural area near the city.

See also
 List of municipalities in Minas Gerais
 Brumadinho dam disaster
 Vale SA

References

External links

Municipalities in Minas Gerais
Populated places established in 1689
1689 establishments in the Portuguese Empire